This is a list of the stations of BHÉV, Budapest suburban railway system (Hu.: Budapesti Helyiérdekű Vasút) in and around the Hungarian capital.

Termini and interchange stations are in bold.

H5 (Szentendrei HÉV)
Length: 21 km, running time: 38 min. Its downtown terminus is available with Metro 2. It runs northwards. Some of the trains go only as far as Békásmegyer station; it is marked on them clearly. Many places of particular interest are along this route, including the Roman Ruins in Aquincum, the thermal baths in Rómaifürdő, and the seasonal pumpkin festival in Szentendre.

 Batthyány tér M
 Margit híd, budai hídfő
 Szépvölgyi út
 Tímár utca
 Szentlélek tér (formerly: Árpád híd)
 Filatorigát
 Kaszásdűlő
 Aquincum
 Rómaifürdő (Roman Bath)
 Csillaghegy
 Békásmegyer
 Budakalász
 Budakalász, Lenfonó
 Szentistvántelep (Saint Stephen Estate)
 Pomáz
 Pannóniatelep (Pannonia Estate)
 Szentendre

H6 (Ráckevei HÉV)
Length: 40 km, running time: 1 h 9-14 min. Its downtown terminus is available with the tram line 1 from the Népliget station of Metro 3. It runs southwards. Some stops are seasonal which means that only a few number of trains stop there.

 Közvágóhíd
 Kén utca
 Pesterzsébet felső (Upper Pesterzsébet)
 Torontál utca
 Soroksár felső (Upper Soroksár)
 Soroksár, Hősök tere (Soroksár, Heroes' Square)
 Szent István utca (Saint Stephen Street)
 Millenniumtelep (Millennium Estate)
 Dunaharaszti felső (Upper Dunaharaszti)
Dunaharaszti külső (Outer Dunaharaszti)
 Szigetszentmiklós
 József Attila-telep (Attila József Estate)
 Szigetszentmiklós alsó (Lower Szigetszentmiklós)
 Szigetszentmiklós, Gyártelep (Szigetszentmiklós-Works)
 Szigethalom
 Szigethalom alsó (Lower Szigethalom)
Tököl
 Szigetcsép
 Egyetemi Tangazdaság (seasonal)
 Szigetszentmárton-Szigetújfalu
 Horgásztanyák (seasonal)
 Angyalisziget (seasonal)
 Ráckeve

H7 (Csepeli HÉV)
Length: 7 km; running time: 13 min. Its downtown terminus is available with the 4 or 6 tram from Corvin-negyed station of Metro 3. It runs southwards.

 Boráros tér
 Müpa – Nemzeti Színház (Müpa – National Theatre; formerly: Lágymányosi híd and Közvágóhíd)
 Szabadkikötő (Free Port)
 Szent Imre tér (Saint Emeric Square)
 Karácsony Sándor utca
 Csepel

H8-9

H8 (Gödöllői HÉV)
This line goes to Gödöllő on a length of 46 minutes and 26 kilometers. Many places of interest are accessible via this line, including the palace in Gödöllő and the water park at Mogyoród. It is accessible from the city via Metro 2, which has its terminus on Örs vezér tere as well.

 Örs vezér tere M
 Rákosfalva
 Nagyicce
 Sashalom (Eagle Mound)
 Mátyásföld, repülőtér (Matthiasfield-Airport)
 Mátyásföld, Imre utca (Matthiasfield-Emeric Street)
 Mátyásföld alsó (Lower Matthiasfield)
Cinkota
 Ilonatelep
 Kistarcsa, kórház (Hospital)
 Kistarcsa
 Zsófialiget
 Kerepes
 Szilasliget
 Mogyoród
 Szentjakab
 Gödöllő, Erzsébet park (Elisaberth Park)
 Gödöllő, Szabadság tér (Liberty Square)
 Gödöllő, Palotakert (Palace Garden)
 Gödöllő

H9 (Csömöri HÉV)
This railway is a branch of the Gödöllői HÉV. Its length is 11 km, running time is 23-24 min. Although not many in number, but some places of interest are accessible via this line, like the swimming pool in Mátyásföld. It is accessible via the Metro 2, which shares the terminus in Budapest with it (Örs vezér tere). There is a connection between the terminus in Csömör and the first stop in Kistarcsa in case of emergency.

 Örs vezér tere M
 Rákosfalva
 Nagyicce
 Sashalom
 Mátyásföld, repülőtér
 Mátyásföld, Imre utca
 Mátyásföld alsó
Cinkota
 Cinkota alsó 
 Árpádföld (Árpádfield) 
 Szabadságtelep (Liberty Estate) 
 Csömör

The planned connector line, M5
A planned suburban railways' connector line, known as M5, or Észak-déli Regionális Gyorsvasút in Hungarian ("North-South Regional Rapid Railway") will replace and connect the lines of the existing HÉV lines between Szentendre, Csepel and Ráckeve, through Budapest downtown, making the present Szentendrei HÉV and Ráckevei HÉV redundant. It will also provide connection for the railway stations in the city.

See also Metro 5, List of M5 metro stations

See also
 BHÉV
 List of Budapest metro stations

External links
 Schedule at BKK website

BHEV
Budapest
HEV
HEV stations